The 1892–93 season is the 19th season of competitive football by Rangers.

Overview
Rangers played a total of 21 competitive matches during the 1892–93 season. They finished second in the Scottish League with a record of 12 wins from 18 matches.

The club ended the season without the Scottish Cup after being beaten at the quarter final stage by St Bernard's, 3–2. They had previously defeated Annbank United and Dumbarton during the cup run.

Results
All results are written with Rangers' score first.

Scottish League

Scottish Cup

Appearances

See also
 1892–93 in Scottish football
 1892–93 Scottish Cup

Rangers F.C. seasons
Ran